Ingrian (  or  ), also called Izhorian, is a nearly extinct Finnic language spoken by the (mainly Orthodox) Izhorians of Ingria. It has approximately 70 native speakers left, all of whom are elderly.

The Ingrian language should be distinguished from the Ingrian dialect of the Finnish language, which became the majority language of Ingria in the 17th century with the influx of Lutheran Finnish immigrants; their descendants, the Ingrian Finns, are often referred to as Ingrians. The immigration of Lutheran Finns was promoted by Swedish authorities, who gained the area in 1617 from Russia, as the local population was (and remained) Orthodox.

Classification
Ingrian is classified, together with Finnish, Karelian (including Livvi), Ludic and Veps, in the Northern Finnic branch of the Uralic languages.

History
In 1932–1937, a Latin-based orthography for the Ingrian language existed, taught in schools of the Soikino Peninsula and the area around the mouth of the Luga River. Several textbooks were published, including in 1936 a grammar of the language. However, in 1937 the Izhorian written language was abolished and mass repressions of the peasantry began.

Alphabet (1932)

Alphabet (1936) 

The order of the 1936 alphabet is similar to the Russian Cyrillic alphabet.

Alphabet (2005–present)
The order of the current alphabet matches the Finnish alphabet.

Dialects
Four dialects groups of Ingrian have been attested, two of which are probably extinct by now:
 Hevaha, spoken along Kovashi River and nearby coastal areas (†)
 Soikkola, spoken on Soikinsky Peninsula and along Sista River
 Ylä-Laukaa (Upper Luga or Oredezhi), spoken along Orodezh River and the upper Luga River (†)
 Ala-Laukaa (Lower Luga), a divergent dialect influenced by Votic

A fifth dialect may have once been spoken on the Karelian Isthmus in northernmost Ingria, and may have been a substrate of local dialects of southwestern Finnish.

Grammar

Like other Uralic languages, Ingrian is a highly agglutinative language. Ingrian inflection is exclusively performed using inflectional suffixes, with prefixes being only used in derivation.

Ingrian nouns and adjectives are inflected for number (singular and plural) and case. Ingrian nominals distinguish between twelve cases, with a thirteenth (the comitative) only being present in nouns. Like Finnish, Ingrian has two cases used for the direct object: the nominative-genitive (used in telic constructions) and the partitive (used in atelic constructions).

Ingrian distinguishes between three persons. There is no distinction in gender, but there is an animacy distinction in interrogative pronouns.

Verbs

Infinitives
The Ingrian verbs have two infinitives, both of which can be inflected (much like the nouns) depending on the situation of usage.

The first infinitive comes in the partitiva or inessiva.
The partitiva of the first infinitive is used after the verbs kyssyyä (to ask), pyytää (to ask), alkaa (to start), tahtoa (to want), suvata (to love), vässyyä (to tire) and pittää (to have to):
 Tahon läätä. (I want to talk.)
The inessiva of the first infinitive  acts as a present participle. It denotes an action that happens simultaneously with the acting verb:
 Höö männää läätes. (They walk, talking.)
The second infinitive comes in the illativa, inessiva, elativa and abessiva.
The illativa of the second infinitive is used to denote a reported act (e.g. after the verb nähhä, to see), to denote a purpose or following the verbs männä (to go), lähtiä (to go) or noissa (to come to pass):
 Nään hänt läkkäämää. (I see that he talks.)
 Issuu läkkäämää. (Sit in order to talk.)
 Hää noisi läkkäämää. (He began talking.)
The inessiva of the second infinitive acts as a continuous clause, introduced by the verb olla (to be). It denotes an action that is happening at the present moment:
 Miä oon läkkäämäs. (I am talking.)
The elativa of the second infinitive denotes either the completion of the action or a distancing from its location:
 Hää poistui läkkäämäst. (He left there, where he was talking.)
The abessiva of the second infinitive acts as a participle of an incomplete action:
 Hää poistui läkkäämätä. (He left not having talked.)

Voice and mood
Ingrian verbs come in three voices: Active, passive and reflexive:
 Hää pessöö (He washes [active voice]); Hää pessää (He is being washed [passive voice]); Hää pessiiää (He washes himself [reflexive voice]).
Both the active and passive voices can be portrayed by the indicative mood (both present and imperfect) and conditional mood, while the imperative can only be set in the active voice:
 Miä nään (I see [Present indicative active]); Miä näin (I saw [Imperfect indicative active]); Miä näkkisin (I would see [Conditional active]); Nää! (See [Imperative active])
 Miä nähhää (I am seen [Present indicative passive]); Miä nähtii (I was seen [Imperfect indicative passive]); Miä nähtäis (I would be seen [Conditional passive]).

Negation
Like in most other Uralic languages, Ingrian negation is formed by adding the inflected form of the verb ei (not) to the connegative of the desired verb:
 Miä oon (I am); Miä en oo (I am not)
The connegative differs depending on the tense and mood of the main verb.
 Miä en oo (I am not); Miä en olt (I was not)

The conjugation of the negative verb follows:

Phonology

Vowels
The Ingrian language has 8 vowels:

Ingrian vowels can be phonologically long and short. Furthermore, these vowels can combine into a total of 14 diphthongs.

Consonants 
The Ingrian language has 22 consonant sounds:

 The consonant ⟨h⟩ is realized as [h] when short and as [xː] when long (this distinction isn't present in the Ala-Laukaa dialect).
 Phonetic palatalization [ʲ] may occur among different dialects before close-front vowels .
 The voiced plosives and fricatives, as well as the postalveolar fricative  are not phonemic in the Soikkola dialect's native words.

The Soikkola dialect has a three-way distinction of consonant length. Both the long and halflong geminates are shown double in writing (⟨tt⟩). Other dialects only differentiate between long and short consonants.

Stress
Primary stress in Ingrian by rule comes on the first syllable, while the secondary stresses come on every further uneven syllable, with the exception of a final syllable.
 puu ("wood") is realized as /puː/
 kana ("chicken") is realized as /ˈkɑnɑ/
 orava ("squirrel") is realized as /ˈorɑʋɑ/
 cirkkulaiset ("sparrows") is realised as /ˈt͡ʃirkːuˌlɑi̯set/
In some late borrowings, the primary stress may shift to another syllable:
 vokala ("vowel") is realized as /ʋoˈkɑlɑ/

Morphophonology
The Ingrian language has several morphophonological processes.

Vowel harmony is the process that the affixes attached to a lemma may change depending on the stressed vowel of the word. This means that if the word is stressed on a back vowel, the affix would contain a back vowel as well, while if the word's stress lies on a front vowel, the affix would naturally contain a front vowel. Thus, if the stress of a word lies on an "a", "o" or "u", the possible affix vowels would be "a", "o" or "u", while if the stress of a word lies on an "ä", "ö" or "y", the possible affix vowels to this word would then be "ä", "ö" or "y":
 nappi (button, nominativa); nappia (button, partitiva)
 näppi (pinch, nominativa); näppiä (pinch, partitiva)
The vowels "e" and "i" are neutral, that is to say that they can be used together with both types of vowels.

References

Bibliography
 Paul Ariste 1981. Keelekontaktid. Tallinn: Valgus. [pt. 2.6. Kolme läänemere keele hääbumine lk. 76 – 82] 
A. Laanest. 1993. Ižorskij Jazyk. In V. N. Jartseva (ed.), Jazyki Mira: Ural'skie Jazyki, 55–63. Moskva: Nauka.
V. Chernyavskij. 2005. Ižorskij Jazyk (Samuchitel'). Ms. 300pp.

External links

 V.Cherniavskij "Izoran keeli (Ittseopastaja)/Ижорский язык (Самоучитель) (Ingrian Self-Study Book")" (in Russian).	
 Ingrian verb conjugation
 Ingrian language resources at Giellatekno
INKEROIN KEEL УЧЕБНОЕ ПОСОБИЕ ПО ИЖОРСКОМУ ЯЗЫКУ

 
Finnic languages
Ingria
Languages of Russia
Severely endangered languages